Joseph Cruess Callaghan,  (4 March 1893 – 2 July 1918) was an Irish flying ace of the First World War, credited with five aerial victories.

Early life and background
Joseph Cruess Callaghan was the eldest of six children of Joseph Patrick Callaghan (of Blackrock, Dublin) and Croasdella Elizabeth Mary (née Bolger; daughter of James Bolger and Croasdella Elizabeth Cruess); he was educated at Jesuit schools such as Belvedere College (Dublin) and Stonyhurst College (Lancashire, England).

First World War
Callaghan was living in Texas when the First World War broke out; he returned home to be commissioned as a second lieutenant in the 7th (Service) Battalion, Royal Munster Fusiliers in January 1915. He transferred to the Royal Flying Corps on 1 September, and trained as a pilot, being granted Royal Aero Club Aviators Certificate No. 1829 on 4 October, after soloing a Maurice Farman biplane at the Military School, Norwich, and was appointed a flying officer on 25 January 1916.

Callaghan was assigned to No. 18 Squadron RFC in April 1916; He piloted an F.E.2b to victory on 26 April, getting credit for destroying a Fokker Eindecker (though the Germans recorded no casualties). He crash-landed near Château de la Haie because of damaged controls, to discover his observer dead, shot through the head. He was wounded in action on 31 July.

Callaghan was appointed a flight commander with the temporary rank of captain and, 4 November 1916, was transferred to the Regular Army. From January 1917 he served as Commandant of No. 2 Auxiliary School of Aerial Gunnery, Turnberry, with the temporary rank of major (graded as a squadron commander), where his aerial stunts earned him the nickname "The Mad Major."

For his service in France Callaghan was awarded the Military Cross, which was gazetted on 13 February 1917. His citation read:

 
In April 1918, Callaghan returned to combat as commanding officer of No. 87 Squadron RAF, flying the Sopwith Dolphin, and gained four more aerial victories between 29 May and 28 June to become a flying ace.

On 2 July 1918, Callaghan single-handedly attacked a group of as many as 25 German fighters. He was killed when his Dolphin was shot down in flames by Leutnant Franz Büchner of Jasta 13. He is buried in the Contay British Cemetery, Contay, France.

Two of Callaghan's younger brothers also died during the war. Captain Stanislaus Cruess Callaghan was killed in a flying accident while serving in Royal Flying Corps Canada on 27 June 1917, while Second Lieutenant Owen (or Eugene) Cruess Callaghan was killed in action on 26 August 1916 while serving in No. 19 Squadron RFC in France.

List of aerial victories

References
Notes

Bibliography
 
 

1893 births
1918 deaths
People from Dún Laoghaire
People educated at Belvedere College
People educated at Stonyhurst College
Royal Munster Fusiliers officers
Royal Flying Corps officers
Royal Air Force personnel of World War I
Irish World War I flying aces
Recipients of the Military Cross
British military personnel killed in World War I
Aviators killed by being shot down